East Career and Technical Academy, also known as East Tech Titan, is a public magnet secondary school in Sunrise Manor, Nevada. It educates grades 9-12 in the Clark County School District. The school was founded in 2007. The principal is Trish Taylor. The school's 2018-2019 enrollment was 1,912.

Programs 
The school offers eight technical programs, grouped into three Houses, that any student can choose from during admission period:

 House 1, for education and medical professions, including programs pathways into becoming Certified Nurse Assistants or sports medicine. 
 House 2, for culinary arts and marketing and hospitality. 
 House 3, for automotive mechanical technology, construction management, electronic engineering technology, and information technology systems.

Graduation Requirement 
To graduate from the school, all students must meet the requirements for the curriculum:

 Minimum GPA average of 3.00 (both weighted and unweighted) for core curriculum subjects: English, Mathematics, Natural Science, and Social Science and History. 
 Completed at least 23 units for graduating with standard diploma, starting from 2022.

Awards 
The school was awarded with Magnet School of America’s Dr. Ronald P. Simpson Distinguished Merit Award in 2018.

References

External links

Educational institutions established in 2008
School buildings completed in 2008
Buildings and structures in Sunrise Manor, Nevada
Clark County School District
High schools in Clark County, Nevada
Public high schools in Nevada
2008 establishments in Nevada